Canary Wharf is an area of London, England, located near the Isle of Dogs in the London Borough of Tower Hamlets. Canary Wharf is defined by the Greater London Authority as being part of London's central business district, alongside Central London. With the City of London, it constitutes one of the main financial centres in the United Kingdom and the world, containing many high-rise buildings including the third-tallest in the UK, One Canada Square, which opened on 26 August 1991.

It has many open areas, including Canada Square, Cabot Square and Westferry Circus.

History

 
Canary Wharf is located on the West India Docks on the Isle of Dogs.

West India Dock Company
From 1802 to the late 1980s, what would become the Canary Wharf Estate was a part of the Isle of Dogs (Millwall), Limehouse, and Poplar and was one of the busiest docks in the world.  West India Docks was primarily developed by Robert Milligan (c. 1746–1809) who set up the West India Dock Company.

Port of London Authority
The Port of London Authority was established in 1909 and took control of West India Dock. Canary Wharf itself takes its name from No. 32 berth of the West Wood Quay of the Import Dock. This was built in 1936 for Fruit Lines Ltd, a subsidiary of Fred Olsen Lines for the Mediterranean and Canary Islands fruit trade. It is located on the Isle of Dogs, the quay and warehouse were given the name Canary Wharf.

London Docklands Development Corporation
After the 1960s, when cargo became containerized, port industry began to decline, leading to all the docks being closed by 1980. After the docks closed in 1980, the British Government adopted policies to stimulate redevelopment of the area, including the creation of the London Docklands Development Corporation (LDDC) in 1981 and the granting of Urban Enterprise Zone status to the Isle of Dogs in 1982.

The Canary Wharf of today began when Michael von Clemm, former chairman of Credit Suisse First Boston (CSFB), came up with the idea to convert Canary Wharf into a back office. Further discussions with G Ware Travelstead led to proposals for a new business district and included the LDDC developing an inexpensive light metro scheme, the Docklands Light Railway, to make use of a large amount of redundant railway infrastructure and to improve access.

The project was sold to the Canadian company Olympia & York and construction began in 1988, master-planned by Skidmore, Owings & Merrill with Yorke Rosenberg Mardall as their UK advisors, and subsequently by Koetter Kim. The first buildings were completed in 1991, including One Canada Square, which became the UK's tallest building at the time and a symbol of the regeneration of Docklands. By the time it opened, the London commercial property market had collapsed, and Olympia and York Canary Wharf Limited filed for bankruptcy in May 1992.

Initially, the City of London saw Canary Wharf as an existential threat. It modified its planning laws to expand the provision of new offices in the City of London, for example, creating offices above railway stations (Blackfriars) and roads (Alban Gate). The resulting oversupply of office space contributed to the failure of the Canary Wharf project.

Canary Wharf Group
In October 1995, an international consortium that included investors such as Alwaleed, bought control for $1.2 billion. Paul Reichmann, of Olympia & York, was named chairman, and Canary Wharf went public in 1999. The new company was called Canary Wharf Limited, and later became Canary Wharf Group.

In 1997, some residents living on the Isle of Dogs launched a lawsuit against Canary Wharf Ltd for private nuisance because the tower interfered with TV signals. The residents lost the case.

Recovery in the property market generally, coupled with continuing demand for large floorplate Grade A office space, slowly improved the level of interest. A critical event in the recovery was the much-delayed start of work on the Jubilee Line Extension, which the government wanted ready for the Millennium celebrations.

In March 2004, Canary Wharf Group plc. was taken over by a consortium of investors, backed by its largest shareholder Glick Family Investments and led by Morgan Stanley using a vehicle named Songbird Estates plc.

Tallest buildings
In addition to being a leading financial centre in the United Kingdom, Canary Wharf is famous for a collection of well-known high-rise buildings:
 As of 2023, Canary Wharf has five out of the top ten tallest buildings in the United Kingdom. 
 One Canada Square and Landmark Pinnacle are the third and fourth tallest buildings in the United Kingdom. 
 The 75-storeys Landmark Pinnacle is the tallest residential tower in the United Kingdom and the whole of western Europe.
 Novotel London Canary Wharf is the tallest all-hotel building in the United Kingdom, and the tallest Novotel in the world.
 One Canada Square (235m) achieved a 21-years record of the tallest building in the United Kingdom from 1991 to 2012. With its distinctive pyramid pinnacle, the building is recognised as a London landmark, and has been featured in many films and television shows.

This table lists completed buildings in Canary Wharf that are at least 100 metres tall.

Listed Buildings

As at 12 Feb 2023, there are 16 listed buildings in Canary Wharf of which 2 are Grade I and 14 in Grade II.

Grade I Listed Buildings

 Quay Walls, Copings and Buttresses to Import Dock and Export Dock: The original West India Docks consists of three docks. The Import Dock, the earliest, was opened in 1800–02, and followed to south by the Export Dock of 1803–06.
 Warehouses and General Offices at Western End of North Quay: originally a range of nine warehouses was built 1800–04 at the western end of North Quay, West India Dock Road. Only two warehouses survived the bombing raid in World War II.

These docks with Nos 1 and 2 warehouses are now the only surviving examples of the first intensive period of London Docklands construction: 1800–10.

Grade II Listed Buildings
Most of the Grade II Listed buildings in Canary Wharf sit to the north-west of West India Dock North, and are located within the West India Dock Conservation Area.  In addition to architectural values, “these buildings and structures are of significance due to their association with the development of the docks and the community that grew up around them”.

Corporations and agencies
Around 105,000 people work in Canary Wharf, and it is home to the world or European headquarters of numerous major banks, professional services firms, and media organisations, including Barclays, Citigroup, Clifford Chance, Credit Suisse, Ernst & Young, Fitch Ratings, HSBC, Infosys, JPMorgan Chase, KPMG, MetLife, Moody's, Morgan Stanley, Royal Bank of Canada, Deutsche Bank, S&P Global, Skadden, Arps, Slate, Meagher & Flom, State Street, The Economist Group and Thomson Reuters,. Until 2018, Canary Wharf also hosted two European Union agencies, European Medicines Agency and European Banking Authority, that moved to Amsterdam and Paris respectively due to Brexit.

Leisure
Marina

West India Quays and Poplar Dock are two marinas that are used as moorings for barges and private leisure river craft and is owned by the Canal & River Trust.

Library

A local public library, called Idea Store Canary Wharf, is in Churchill Place shopping mall and run by Tower Hamlets Council which opened on Thursday 16 March 2006 as part of the Idea Store project and is the borough fourth Idea Store.

Cinema
Canary Wharf hosts two multiplexes (cinemas), one on West India Quay run by Cineworld. and another at Crossrail Place called Everyman Cinema.

Areas 

Canada Square
Canada Square is one of the central squares at Canary Wharf.  It is a large open space with grass, except during the winter when it is converted into an ice rink.  The square is named after Canada, because the original developers of modern Canary Wharf, Olympia & York, wanted to reflect their heritage.  Underneath the square is Canada Place shopping mall.

Westferry Circus
Westferry Circus is on the west side of Canary Wharf. It is a garden at ground level, and below is a roundabout allowing traffic to flow through.  The garden is enclosed by bespoke hand-crafted ornamental railings and entrance gates by artist Giuseppe Lund. The area has a long history, dating back to 1812, when the Poplar and Greenwich Roads Company operated a horse ferry between Greenwich and the Isle of Dogs. It operated on the West Ferry and East Ferry Roads, which the names survived. Westferry Circus was chosen as the name for the roundabout and park by virtue of its proximity to Westferry Road.

Cabot Square
Cabot Square is one of the biggest squares at Canary Wharf, with a large fountain at the centre. The inner perimeter has additional fountains covered by trees. The square has large circular glass ventilation holes to allow gases to escape from the underground car park. The square is named after John Cabot and his son Sebastian, who were Italian explorers who settled in England in 1484.

Churchill Place
Churchill Place is an area on the east side of Canary Wharf.  It is named after Winston Churchill.

Columbus Courtyard
A small square on the west side of Canary Wharf named after Christopher Columbus. The first phase of Canary Wharf was completed in 1992, 500 years after Columbus arrived in America.

Chancellor Passage
A passageway south of Cabot Square.  Named after Richard Chancellor who sailed with Sir John Willoughby from Greenwich on their voyage through the White Sea to Moscow.

Wren Landing
Small area north of Cabot Square. Leads to North Dock footbridge towards Port East. Named after British architect Christopher Wren.

Crossrail Place Roof Garden
A 4,160m² roof garden, one of London's largest, houses on the top of seven-storey Crossrail Place structure, which contains the Elizabeth line Canary Wharf station. Opened to public in 2015, it lies almost exactly on the Meridian line splitting eastern and western hemispheres. The plants originating from the eastern hemisphere are planted to the East of the Meridian line in the garden, with those from the Western hemisphere on the opposite side.

Local government elections
Every four years, residents of Canary Wharf ward elect two councillors to represent them on Tower Hamlets Council. 

† Andrew Wood was elected for the Conservative Party in 2018, but resigned to sit as an Independent in 2020.

Transport  
Canary Wharf is served by London-wide, regional, national and international transport connections.

Rail 
Canary Wharf is in London fare zone 2, and several stations can be found throughout the estate.

 The Docklands Light Railway (DLR) calls at Canary Wharf, Heron Quays and West India Quay stations. The line opened in 1987.
 DLR trains link Canary Wharf northbound to Bank in the City of London, via Shadwell. Northbound trains also travel to Stratford via Poplar and Bow Church. Southbound trains terminate south of the River Thames in Lewisham, calling at Greenwich en route.
 London Underground Jubilee line services call at Canary Wharf station. Eastbound trains travel to Stratford via North Greenwich, Canning Town and West Ham. Westbound trains link Canary Wharf to the  West End and key London interchanges including London Bridge, Waterloo and Baker Street. Trains towards Central London eventually terminate in North West London.
 The Elizabeth line (constructed by the Crossrail project) calls at Canary Wharf station. The line provides the area with a frequent, direct connection to the City of London and the West End. Westbound trains serve Central London and key interchanges at Liverpool Street and Paddington. Elizabeth line trains also serve Heathrow Airport and Reading, Berkshire to the west. Eastbound services terminate at Abbey Wood.

Stations in Canary Wharf only offer direct connections to London and Berkshire destinations. Regional and national National Rail connections can be found elsewhere in London, including at Liverpool Street, Lewisham, London Bridge, Stratford, Stratford International and Waterloo.

Road 

Major roads near Canary Wharf include:

 A12 - begins in nearby Blackwall and carries traffic northeast towards Stratford, the M11 (for Stansted Airport ), and destinations in Essex and East Anglia.
 A13 (East India Dock Road) - westbound to Limehouse and the City of London (Aldgate); eastbound towards Barking, the M25 and Southend.
 A102 (Blackwall Tunnel) - begins in nearby Blackwall and carries traffic southbound to Greenwich, the A2 and the A20 for destinations in Kent.
 A1020 (Lower Lea Crossing) - carries traffic eastbound to London City Airport.
 A1203 (Limehouse Link) - carries traffic eastbound to Shadwell and the City of London (Tower Hill).
 A1205 (Burdett Road) - carries traffic northbound to Mile End and Hackney.
 A1206 (Westferry Circus/Prestons Road) - loops around the western, southern and eastern edges of the Isle of Dogs. Links to the A1261.
 A1261 (Aspen Way) - westbound to the A13 for Limehouse and the city; eastbound to the A1020 for City Airport and the A13 towards Barking.

Air pollution 

Transport for London (TfL) and the London Borough of Tower Hamlets monitor the air quality around Canary Wharf.

In 2017, an automatic monitoring station in Blackwall found that local air quality failed to meet UK National Air Quality Objectives, recording an annual average Nitrogen Dioxide (NO2) concentration of 56 μg/m3 (micrograms per cubic metre). The National Objective is set by the government at 40 μg/m3.

Alternative stations nearer Canary Wharf recorded cleaner air. Monitors at the Limehouse Link/Westferry Road junction and on Prestons Road recorded a 2017 annual average NO2 concentration of 40 μg/m3, which Tower Hamlets argue fails to meet the UK National Objective.

Buses 
London Buses routes 135, 277, D3, D7, D8, N277 and N550 call at bus stops near Canary Wharf. Bus 135 links Canary Wharf directly to Liverpool Street in the City of London, and bus D8 to Stratford.

Riverboat 
Several Riverboat services call at Canary Wharf Pier, including:

 RB1 - eastbound to North Greenwich and Woolwich Arsenal Pier; westbound to Tower, London Bridge City, Bankside, Blackfriars, Embankment, the London Eye and Westminster.
 RB1X - eastbound to North Greenwich and Royal Wharf Pier; westbound to Tower, London Bridge City, Bankside, Embankment, the London Eye and Westminster (limited service to Battersea Power Station).
 RB4 - the Canary Wharf – Rotherhithe Ferry crosses the Thames to Nelson Dock.
 RB6 - limited eastbound service towards Putney.

Tower, London Bridge City and Blackfriars are in the City of London. Oyster Cards are valid for travel on TfL-coordinated riverboat services.

Airports 
London City Airport is three miles from Canary Wharf. Over 4.8 million passengers passed through City Airport in 2018. The airport serves domestic and international destinations, including New York.

London City Airport is on the DLR. Passengers from Canary Wharf can change trains at Poplar for services to the Airport.

Cycling 
The Canary Wharf Group, London Borough of Tower Hamlets and Transport for London (TfL) provide cycling infrastructure in and around Canary Wharf. Several leisure and commuter routes pass through or near the estate, including:

 National Cycle Route 1 (NCR 1) - a leisure cycle route from Dover, Kent to Shetland, Scotland. The route is indirect, running through London on low-traffic paths. In North London, the route runs from the Greenwich Foot Tunnel to Enfield Lock via Canary Wharf, Mile End and Tottenham. The route runs to the west of Canary Wharf, parallel to the River Thames.
 EuroVelo 2 ("The Capitals Route") - an international leisure cycle route from Moscow, Russia to Galway, Ireland. In North London, EV2 follows the route of NCR 1.
 National Cycle Route 13 (NCR 13) - a leisure cycle route from the City to Fakenham, Norfolk. The route is indirect, running through East London on low-traffic paths. The route leaves London near Rainham.
 Cycle Superhighway 3 (CS3) - a commuter cycle route from Barking to West London. The route runs east–west through nearby Poplar on low-traffic or residential streets. The route is signposted and unbroken.
 East of Poplar, the route to Barking predominantly runs on traffic-free cycle track.
 West of Limehouse, the route runs on low-traffic or traffic-free paths to Shadwell. The route is signposted and unbroken. After Shadwell, the route becomes a traffic-free cycle track which provides Canary Wharf with a direct link to Tower Hill, Blackfriars, Westminster, Buckingham Palace, Hyde Park Corner and Lancaster Gate.
 Cycleway from Hackney to the Isle of Dogs - proposed cycle link which would link Canary Wharf directly to Mile End on traffic-free cycle track.
 Limehouse Cut towpath - shared-use path from nearby Limehouse to Stratford. The route is traffic-free.
 Regent's Canal towpath - shared-use path from nearby Limehouse to Angel. The route is traffic-free and passes through Mile End, Haggerston, and Islington.

Culture
Opened in 2003, the Museum of London Docklands is one of the  main attractions in the area.

Canary Wharf has been reported since 2017 as part of the Pokémon Go augmented reality game to being the home for the most wanted Pokémon gyms in London including Canary Wharf DLR station and Montgomery Square.

Canary Wharf Group published an official Pokémon map for PokéStop's and Pokémon Gyms, the managing director for retail Camille Waxer said in 2016 that Pokémon Go has serious potential to attract new audiences to the area, particularly food and drink outlets are seeing an increase in footfall.

Canary Wharf hosts the "Winter Lights" art installations each January. 2023 Canary Wharf Winter Lights Festival is the largest light art festival in London.

Canary Wharf features in both the Doctor Who and Torchwood franchises as the fictional base of the Torchwood Institute, an organisation created by Queen Victoria to combat extraterrestrial threats. Canary Wharf features heavily as the staging post for the 2007 Cyberman invasion of Earth and is heavily damaged during a resulting battle between the Cybermen and the Daleks.

Thom Yorke of Radiohead, during their concert Live at the Astoria in May 1994, explained their song Fake Plastic Trees is about Canary Wharf.

Canary Wharf Art Trail
  Environment of financial and business district seldom can stimulate artistic inspiration, it is surprised to find Canary Wharf Art Trail is the largest outdoor public art collection in London. People are free to visit more than 100 pieces of stand-alone sculptures, integrated architectural works, and outdoor art exhibiting outside buildings around the Canary Wharf area. Two printed maps are regularly updated by Canary Wharf Group for visitors to discover and identify artworks permanently on display all over the estate.

 Canary Wharf Art Map: over 100 pieces of artworks, with a brief description, are numbered sequentially as to their exhibition locations at Canary Wharf. 
 Children's Art Trail:  a smaller trail of 12 sculptures and artworks for children.

Media
The East London Advertiser (formerly The Docklands & East London Advertiser) is a local newspaper printing weekly and also online.

Wharf life is a fortnightly publication of 15,000 copies for Canary Wharf, Docklands and east London. An E-edition is also available.

See also

 1996 Docklands bombing
 The Wharf newspaper
 Cascades, Isle of Dogs
 Millwall

References

Further reading

External links

 Canary Development
 Canary Wharf – Official Information Site
 Canary Wharf Group plc
 Canary Wharf projects on Skyscrapernews
 Canary Wharf building information & photos
 Listed Buildings in Canary Wharf Ward, Tower Hamlets

 
Areas of London
Financial districts in the United Kingdom
Redevelopment projects in London
Buildings and structures in the London Borough of Tower Hamlets
Tourist attractions in the London Borough of Tower Hamlets
Companies formerly listed on the London Stock Exchange
Economy of London
Geography of the London Borough of Tower Hamlets
Major centres of London
Central business districts in the United Kingdom
Privately owned public spaces